Stephen Hough Wright (born April 8, 1959) is a former  American football offensive tackle in the National Football League for the Dallas Cowboys, Indianapolis Colts and Los Angeles Raiders. He was also a member of the Oakland Invaders of the United States Football League. He played college football at Northern Iowa and then played eleven professional seasons with four teams from 1981–1992. He also appeared on Survivor: Redemption Island where he placed tenth and became the third jury member.

Early years
Wright attended Wayzata High School, where he played football, basketball, track, and hockey. He was an All-American in the shot put and discus throw.

He accepted a football scholarship from the University of Northern Iowa. He played offensive tackle during his first three years. As a senior he was switched to tight end, registering 8 receptions for 73 yards and one touchdown.

In 1997, he was inducted into the Northern Iowa Athletics Hall of Fame.

Professional career

Dallas Cowboys
Wright was signed as an undrafted free agent by the Dallas Cowboys after the 1981 NFL Draft. He appeared in 16 games, playing mainly on special teams and as a backup offensive tackle.

In 1982, he was moved to the backup guard position. Because of an injury to Kurt Petersen, he was the right guard in the offensive line that blocked on Tony Dorsett's record 99-yard touchdown run against the Minnesota Vikings. Also while with the Cowboys, Wright additionally blocked for another future Survivor contestant, Gary Hogeboom (Survivor: Guatemala), who was the team's backup quarterback.

Baltimore/Indianapolis Colts (first stint)
On August 26, 1983, he was traded to the Baltimore Colts in exchange for a sixth round draft choice (#144-Kurt Ploeger). In his first year with the Baltimore Colts he started ten games at right guard. He missed 3 games with an ankle injury. In 1984, when the team moved to Indianapolis, he replaced an injured Chris Hinton at left tackle and started nine games.

Oakland Invaders (USFL)
In December 1984, he signed with the Michigan Panthers of the United States Football League. Before the start of the next season, the Panthers merged with the Oakland Invaders. The team would reach the USFL Championship Game, losing to the Baltimore Stars. Wright, who wore #70 with the Invaders, scored a touchdown in a May game against the Denver Gold when Invaders quarterback Bobby Hebert completed a two-yard pass to Wright, who was tackle eligible on the play.

Los Angeles Raiders
In 1987, he signed with the Los Angeles Raiders. After the players went on a strike on the third week of the season, those games were canceled (reducing the 16 game season to 15) and the NFL decided that the games would be played with replacement players. Wright was part of the Raiders replacement team, that was given the mock name "Masqueraiders" by the media. He ended up playing well in those games as the starter at right tackle and was kept for the rest of the season playing mainly as a backup.

In 1990, he became a full-time starter at right tackle after replacing an injured Bruce Wilkerson and keeping his job after Wilkerson returned and was moved to left tackle.

In 1992, he missed nine games with a right shoulder injury. On August, 23, 1993, he was placed on the injured reserve list. He retired from professional football in June 1994 at the age of 35.

Personal life
Wright founded Cloudburst, a company that was the first to provide NFL sideline mist cooling. Cloudburst was contracted to cool the 1996 Atlanta Summer Olympics.  Steve's other mist cooling company Mist & Cool, was in over 1,500 Home Depots, Lowes, Costco and Targets. He sold the business in 2000. Today, Wright is married and lives in Malibu, California.

In August, 2010, Wright appeared as a contestant on the 22nd season of the American competitive reality television series Survivor. On Day 30, he was the 13th person voted out of the main game and was sent to Redemption Island. He was eliminated on Day 31. 

10/4/2022 Wright was awarded a Patent for his rearward facing toilet the Courtesy 180 

1/31/2023 Wright signed publishing contract for his memoir Aggressively Human due out in November 2023

References

1959 births
Living people
Sportspeople from Huntington Beach, California
Players of American football from Minnesota
Players of American football from St. Louis
American football offensive tackles
Northern Iowa Panthers football players
Dallas Cowboys players
Baltimore Colts players
Indianapolis Colts players
Oakland Invaders players
Los Angeles Raiders players
Survivor (American TV series) contestants
National Football League replacement players
Ed Block Courage Award recipients